Farrokhi (also Romanized as Farrokhī; also known as Farūkhi) is a city in Biabanak Rural District, in the Central District of Khur and Biabanak County, Isfahan Province, Iran. At the 2006 census, its population was 2,715, in 668 families.

Farrokhi's documented history begins as late as the Qajar period.  It was then one of the eight major villages that constituted the district of Biabanak (Khur and Biabanak County).  The earliest demographic data comes from the local census of 1884, which recorded 230 households with 939 inhabitants. Farrokhi has its local dialect, called Farvi or Farvigi, a variety of the West Iranian language spoken in southern Biabanak district.

References 

Populated places in Khur and Biabanak County
Cities in Isfahan Province